Ebadur Rahman Chowdhury is a Bangladesh Nationalist Party politician and a former Jatiya Sangsad member representing the Moulvibazar-1 constituency. He is a former State Minister of Disaster Management and Relief during 2001–2003.

Career
Chowdhury was elected to parliament from Moulvibazar-1 as a Bangladesh Nationalist Party candidate in 2001.

References

Living people
People from Moulvibazar District
Bangladesh Nationalist Party politicians
Jatiya Party politicians
4th Jatiya Sangsad members
5th Jatiya Sangsad members
6th Jatiya Sangsad members
8th Jatiya Sangsad members
Year of birth missing (living people)
Place of birth missing (living people)